The 2019 Durand Cup was the 129th edition of the Durand Cup, oldest football tournament in Asia, since the tournament's founding in 1888. 16 teams competed in the tournament. The matches were played across three locations in West Bengal, namely Kolkata, Howrah and Kalyani  from 2 August 2019. The final took place at the Salt Lake Stadium on 24 August 2019.

Army Green were the defending champions, having defeated NEROCA in the 2016 final, however they did not qualify for the semi-finals having finished last in the group. Gokulam Kerala won their maiden title by defeating Mohun Bagan 2–1 in the 2019 Durand Cup Final which was held on 24 August 2019. After the cancellation of Super Cup, Durand Cup was promoted as the de facto domestic cup for 2019–20 season.

Teams
A total of 16 teams participated in this year's competition. 5 teams from Indian Super League, 6 from I-League, 1 2nd division club and 4 armed forces teams.

{{Location map+|India|width=360|float=right
|caption=Location of teams of the 2019 Durand Cup. Indian Super League Team I League Team 2nd Division I League Team Armed Force Team Kolkata, New Delhi (Armed Force)
|places=

  Indian Super League
 ATK
 Bengaluru
 Chennaiyin
 FC Goa
 Jamshedpur

  I-League 
 Chennai City F.C.
 East Bengal
 Gokulam Kerala 
 Mohun Bagan
 Real Kashmir
 TRAU

 I-League 2nd division
 Mohammedan

  Armed Force Teams
 Indian Air Force
 Army Green
 Army Red
 Indian Navy

Prize money

Official sponsors and partners

Powered by 
GAIL

Co-sponsors 

 Coal India
 State Bank of India
 Sunfeast
 SERVO IndianOil

Associate sponsors 

 ONGC
 UCO Bank
 Cadbury Bourn Vita
 Dabur
 Amul
 JIS Group

Supported by 

 GRSE
 Mazagon Dock Shipbuilders
 Allahabad Bank
 Sneha Farms
 NOVA Lens
 PS Group Realty
 Maxo Genius
 Gloster
 Siti Networks

Tournament partner 

 IFA W.B.
 Cherry Tree

Venues

Broadcasting 
All match were streamed LIVE on Addatimes. Semifinals & Final matches were streamed LIVE on Hotstar as well.

91.9 Friends FM was the official radio partner of the tournament.

Round Dates

Group stage

Group A

Group B

Group C

Group D

Knockout stage
Winners of each group will progress into the semi-finals. The winner of  Group A will face the winner of Group D, and the winner of Group B will face the winner of Group C in the semi-final.

The knockout matches will have thirty minutes of extra-time if the teams are tied at the end of usual time, and if they are drawing even after that, the winner of the fixture will be decided through penalty shootouts.

Bracket

Semi-finals

Final

Goalscorers

See also

 Rovers Cup
 I-League

References

External links
 Durand Cup website.

Durand Cup seasons
2019 domestic association football cups
India, Durand Cup
2019–20 in Indian football